Tamba Boimah Hali (born 3 November 1983) is a Liberian former American football linebacker and musician. He played college football at Pennsylvania State University (Penn State), where he earned All-American honors, and was drafted by the Kansas City Chiefs in the first round of the 2006 NFL Draft.

He played his entire twelve-year career for the Chiefs, where he was selected to six consecutive Pro Bowls from 2010 to 2015 and was a Second-team All-Pro selection in 2011 and in 2013.

Early life
Hali was born in Gbarnga, Liberia. He was sent to the United States at the age of 10 to escape civil war-torn Liberia. He worked to become an NFL-caliber player because he thought it would help him raise the money to reunite with his mother, Rachel Keita, and bring her to the United States after not having seen her for more than twelve years.

Hali attended Teaneck High School in Teaneck, New Jersey, where he played for the high school football team. He was named a high school All-American. He also lettered in basketball.

Considered a four-star recruit by Rivals.com, Hali was listed as the No. 5 strongside defensive end in the nation in 2002.

College career
Hali received an athletic scholarship to attend Pennsylvania State University, where he played for coach Joe Paterno's Penn State Nittany Lions football team from 2002 to 2005. Following his senior season in 2005, was recognized as a unanimous All-American, the Big Ten Defensive Lineman of the Year, and a first-team All-Big Ten selection. He was instrumental in helping the Nittany Lions finish 11–1, winning the Big Ten championship and the Orange Bowl that season.

He led the Big Ten with 11 sacks (tied for eighth nationally) and 17 tackles for loss and earned numerous accolades for his play. He was a finalist for the Bronko Nagurski Trophy, presented to the nation's top defensive player, and the Ted Hendricks Defensive End Award.

Hali's season sack total is tied for sixth-best at Penn State and his 36 career tackles for loss are tied with Matt Millen for tenth best. Hali received the Robert B. Mitinger Award, which is given to the Nittany Lion football player who best personifies courage, character, and social responsibility.

Hali was named defensive most valuable player (MVP) of the 2006 Senior Bowl. He was later inducted into the Senior Bowl Hall of Fame.

Professional career
Hali entered the 2006 NFL Draft ranked as the third-best defensive end behind Mario Williams and Kamerion Wimbley. Tamba spent some time as a defensive tackle in college.

There was not much pre-draft hype for Hali heading into the 2006 NFL Draft until The Sporting News made his amazing story of escape from war-torn Liberia at age 10 their 21 April 2006 cover story. NFL scouts began to take notice, reporting that Hali presented himself in an excellent manner not only in his workout but also in his interview at the NFL Combine. Hali was chosen 20th overall by the Kansas City Chiefs in a surprise move. Hali was projected by many analysts to be selected later in the draft, but Kansas City did not hesitate to select the best player possible to help their struggling defense.

2006 season
Making an early impression in Chiefs camp, Tamba Hali earned the nickname of "The TambaHawk" (a take on "Tomahawk"), and the starting position for defensive end.

On 31 July 2006, Hali was excused from the Chiefs two-a-day practices at training camp in River Falls, Wisconsin and flew back to his home in Teaneck, New Jersey to be sworn in as a permanent citizen of the United States. On 28 September 2006, Hali's mother Rachel arrived in Kansas City, Missouri and currently lives with Tamba on a one-year visa. On 1 October, she saw her son play for the first time as the Chiefs shut out the San Francisco 49ers, 41–0.

Hali won the Mack Lee Hill award as the top Chiefs rookie for 2006. At the end of the 2006 NFL season, Hali led the Chiefs with eight sacks. He was named to the NFL All-Rookie Team.

2007–2010

In 2007, Hali had 7.5 sacks to go along with 59 total tackles, two passes defensed, and two forced fumbles. Hali moved to right defensive end for the 2008 season, replacing Jared Allen. In the 2008 season, he had three sacks, 55 total tackles, two passes defensed, and three forced fumbles. In 2009, Hali was again moved—this time to outside linebacker—to accommodate new head coach Todd Haley's 3–4 defense. Hali's transformation from an undersized 4–3 DE to a 3–4 OLB was an amazing one considering his time in college as a defensive tackle. He finished the 2009 season with 8.5 sacks, 63 total tackles, one pass defensed, four forced fumbles, and scored a safety.

In 2010, the Chiefs hired a new defensive coordinator, Romeo Crennel. He earned AFC Defensive Player of the Week for Week 3. Hali finished the season with an AFC-leading 14.5 sacks, leading to his first invitation to the Pro Bowl, which he declined citing personal reasons. Chiefs' general manager Scott Pioli made the signing of Hali to a long-term deal his top priority that off-season. Despite a lockout being in place, the two sides signed a five-year, $60 million contract ($35 million guaranteed) on 4 August 2011. He was ranked 64th by his fellow players on the NFL Top 100 Players of 2011.

2011–2016
Hali repaid this loyalty with an All-Pro season, racking up a career-high 83 tackles and leading the team in sacks (12) for the fifth time in his six seasons as a Chief. He was named an All-Pro and selected to play in the 2012 Pro Bowl. Hali started all 16 games in 2011 and finished second in sacks in the AFC. He tied for third in the conference with four forced fumbles, a team-best 12 tackles for loss, and 31 quarterback pressures. Hali moved into fourth place on the Chiefs' career sacks list that season. He was ranked #34 his fellow players on the NFL Top 100 Players of 2012.

On 20 August 2012, the NFL suspended Hali for one game for a violation of the league's substance abuse policy. On 26 December 2012, Hali was announced the starting outside linebacker for the AFC in the 2013 Pro Bowl. He finished the 2012 season with nine sacks, 51 total tackles, two passes defensed, and one forced fumble.

In the 2013 season, Hali started in 15 games. In 15 appearances, he had 46 tackles, of which 39 were solo. He had 11 sacks, five forced fumbles, and one interception. In the 2013 season, Hali earned AFC Defensive Player of the Week for Weeks 6 and 14. He earned his third consecutive Pro Bowl nod and was ranked 43rd by his fellow players on the NFL Top 100 Players of 2014. In the 2014 season, Hali started in all 16 games. He had 59 tackles, of which 47 were solo, six sacks, and three forced fumbles He earned AFC Defensive Player of the Week in Week 15. He earned his fourth consecutive Pro Bowl nomination and was ranked 70th by his fellow players on the NFL Top 100 Players of 2015.

On 8 March 2015, Hali restructured his contract to free up $3 million in cap space to stay with the Chiefs. Throughout the off-season, it was believed Hali would be released. In the 2015 season, he had 6.5 sacks, 48 total tackles, one pass defensed, and two forced fumbles. Hali made the Pro Bowl for the fifth consecutive year and was ranked 84th by his fellow players on the NFL Top 100 Players of 2016. On 8 March 2016, Hali signed a three-year contract to stay with the Chiefs. In the 2016 season, he had 3.5 sacks, 34 total tackles, and one fumble recovery.

2017 season
In 2017, Hali started the 2017 season on the physically unable to perform list due to an undisclosed injury that kept him out all of training camp and the preseason. He began practicing again on 2 November. The Chiefs had 21 days from the day he starts practicing to either activate him or place him on injured reserve. He was moved to the active roster on 4 November 2017, prior to the team's Week 9 game against the Dallas Cowboys. He appeared in five games and had one tackle and one quarterback hit.

On 12 March 2018, Hali was released by the Chiefs after 12 seasons. He finished his tenure with the Chiefs second in team history in sacks behind only Hall of Fame linebacker Derrick Thomas. On 10 May 2021, Hali signed a one-day contract with the Chiefs to retire as a member of the team.

NFL career statistics

Personal life
Hali has an older half-brother, also named Tamba. This stems from a tradition in the Kissi culture wherein the second son born to a woman is always named "Tamba".

On 8 January 2016, Hali's fiancé, Mary Glasgow, gave birth to their son, Tamba Hali II.

In his spare time, Hali writes rap music; he records in a studio in his basement. On 9 June 2017, Hali released his single that was produced by Masterkraft, "The One For Me", on Apple Music.

Hali became a U.S. citizen on 31 July 2006. Following his rookie year, Hali began training in Brazilian jiu-jitsu under the instruction of Rener Gracie and was promoted to purple belt in November 2017.

References

External links

 Official website 
 "Hali Featured on Cover of The Sporting News" gopsusports.com, 12 April 2006 
 "By the grace of God, I am alive." The Sporting News, 13 April 2006 
 "Hali getting mixed signals" northjersey.com, 24 April 2006 
 "Hali has come too far to stop short," USA Today, 1 March 2006
 "The great escape: Hali travels amazing road to achieve football stardom," Sports Illustrated, 25 February 2006 
 "Hali wrecks Wisconsin to earn Player of Week award," USA Today, 6 November 2005
 Hali gets sized for his first Chiefs jersey VIDEO 
 "Chiefs rookie Hali becomes U.S. citizen," NFL.com, 1 August 2006 
 “Reluctant superstar: Chiefs linebacker Tamba Hali getting job done, even if he does so quietly,”Associated Press, 20 December 2011.

1983 births
Living people
All-American college football players
American Conference Pro Bowl players
American football defensive ends
American football outside linebackers
American practitioners of Brazilian jiu-jitsu
American people of Liberian descent
Doping cases in American football
Kansas City Chiefs players
Liberian players of American football
Penn State Nittany Lions football players
Players of American football from New Jersey
Sportspeople from Bergen County, New Jersey
Sportspeople from Monrovia
Teaneck High School alumni
Unconferenced Pro Bowl players